Mamulique may refer to:

Mamulique language, an extinct Pakawan language
Mamulique, Nuevo León, the town in Nuevo León from which the language originates